Julianne Pollard-Larkin is an American medical physicist, assistant professor at MD Anderson Cancer Center in Houston, TX and is also the interim Physics Service Chief for the Thoracic service of MD Anderson’s Division of Radiation Oncology. She is also the Vice-Chair of the American Association of Physicists in Medicine (AAPM) Diversity and Inclusion Subcommittee.

Biography and education 
Pollard-Larkin grew up in Miami, Florida, as the daughter of a schoolteacher and an Army lieutenant. Even as a child she was interested in science, and at age eleven she developed an interest in space after seeing a picture of NASA astronaut Mae Jemison on the cover of a magazine. She double majored in Physics and Mathematics at the University of Miami where she received her Bachelor of Science. Towards the end of her undergraduate degree her mother was diagnosed with breast cancer. Through accompanying her mother to radiation therapy, Pollard-Larkin met a medical physicist and learned about the existence of that field. Subsequently, she attended the University of California, Los Angeles where she was the first African American woman to earn her PhD in Biomedical Physics. During her PhD, her research focused on evaluating radiomodulatory agents on cell lines derived from patients with the rare radiosensitive genetic disorder Ataxia-Telangiectasia.

Career 

After graduating from UCLA in 2008, Pollard-Larkin began her clinical residency in medical physics at the University of Texas MD Anderson Cancer Center in Houston, TX. In 2010, she became an Instructor in the Department of Radiation Physics in the Division of Radiation Oncology at the MD Anderson Cancer Center, subsequently becoming an Assistant Professor there in 2012. In 2011, she was certified by the American Board of Radiology. In 2019, she was promoted to Associate Professor.

Personal life 
Pollard-Larkin lives in Houston, TX. She is a mother.

References

Living people
University of Miami alumni
University of California, Los Angeles alumni
21st-century American physicists
Scientists from Florida
American women physicists
21st-century American women scientists
Year of birth missing (living people)
21st-century African-American women
21st-century African-American scientists
African-American women scientists